The 1991 European Cup was the 13th edition of the European Cup of athletics.

The "A" Finals were held in Frankfurt, Germany. The first two teams qualified for the 1992 IAAF World Cup.

"A" Final
Held on 29 and 30 June in Frankfurt, Germany

Team standings

Results summary

Men's events

Women's events

"B" Final
Both "B" finals held on 22 and 23 June in Barcelona, Spain

"C" Finals
All "C" finals held on 22 and 23 June

Men

"C1" Final
Held in Viseu, Portugal

"C2" Final
Held in Athens, Greece

Women

"C1" Final
Held in Viseu, Portugal

"C2" Final
Held in Athens, Greece

References

 European Cup results (Men) from GBR Athletics
 European Cup results (Women) from GBR Athletics
 Men's Relay medalists
 Men's 4×100 m relay medalists
 Women's Relay medalists
 4×400 m relay medalists

European Cup (athletics)
European Cup
Sports competitions in Frankfurt
International athletics competitions hosted by Germany
European Cup Athletics